Modern Sanitation was a British journal published in the 20th century.

It documented developments in sanitation, water infrastructure, and later building developments and maintenance in Britain, with a particular focus on London.
By 1946 it was known as Sanitation, drainage and water supply, but by 1967 it was known as Modern Sanitation and Building Maintenance.

References

Academic journals of the United Kingdom
Sanitation